The Lost Chord is a 1917 British silent drama film directed by Wilfred Noy and starring Barbara Conrad, Malcolm Keen and Dorothy Bellew. It was inspired by Arthur Sullivan's 1877 song "The Lost Chord". In 1925 when Noy moved to the United States, he remade the film as his American debut.

Cast
 Barbara Conrad as Madeleine  
 Malcolm Keen as David 
 Concordia Merrel as Joan 
 Dorothy Bellew   
 Mary Ford   
 H. Manning Haynes

References

Bibliography
 Low, Rachael. The History of the British Film 1918-1929. George Allen & Unwin, 1971.

External links
 

1917 films
1917 drama films
British drama films
British silent feature films
1910s English-language films
Films directed by Wilfred Noy
British black-and-white films
1910s British films
Silent drama films